Besides Euclid's formula, many other formulas for generating Pythagorean triples have been developed.

Euclid's, Pythagoras', and Plato's formulas

Euclid's, Pythagoras' and Plato's formulas for calculating triples have been described here: 

The methods below appear in various sources, often without attribution as to their origin.

Fibonacci's method
If  is the -th member of this sequence then .

Choose any odd square number  from this sequence and let this square be the -th term of the sequence. Also, let  be the sum of the previous  terms,  and let    be the sum of all  terms. Then we have established that  and we have generated the primitive triple [a, b, c]. This method produces an infinite number of primitive triples, but not all of them.

EXAMPLE:
Choose . This odd square number is the fifth term of the sequence, because .

Sequences of mixed numbers

Michael Stifel published the following method in 1544. To calculate a Pythagorean triple, take any term of this sequence and convert it to an improper fraction (for mixed number , the corresponding improper fraction is ). Then its numerator and denominator are the sides, b and a, of a right triangle, and the hypotenuse is b + 1. For example:

 

As before, to produce a triple from this sequence, take any term and convert it to an improper fraction. Then its numerator and denominator are the sides, b and a, of a right triangle, and the hypotenuse is b + 2. For example:

 

With a the shorter and b the longer legs of a triangle and c its hypotenuse, the Pythagoras family of triplets is defined by c − b = 1, the Plato family by c − b = 2, and the Fermat family by |a − b| = 1. The Stifel sequence produces all primitive triplets of the Pythagoras family, and the Ozanam sequence produces all primitive triples of the Plato family.  The triplets of the Fermat family must be found by other means.

Dickson's method

Leonard Eugene Dickson (1920) attributes to himself the following method for generating Pythagorean triples.

Then:

 

A simple proof of Dickson's method has been presented by Josef Rukavicka, J.  (2013).  

Example: Choose r = 6.  Then .
The three factor-pairs of 18 are: (1, 18), (2, 9), and (3, 6). All three factor pairs will produce triples using the above equations.

s = 1, t = 18 produces the triple [7, 24, 25] because x = 6 + 1 = 7,  y = 6 + 18 = 24,  z = 6 + 1 + 18 = 25.

s = 2, t =   9 produces the triple [8, 15, 17] because x = 6 + 2 = 8,  y = 6 +  9 = 15,  z = 6 + 2 + 9 = 17.

s = 3, t =   6 produces the triple [9, 12, 15] because x = 6 + 3 = 9,  y = 6 +  6 = 12,  z = 6 + 3 + 6 = 15. (Since s and t are not coprime, this triple is not primitive.)

Generalized Fibonacci sequence

Method I

for n ≥ 4.

Method II

A Pythagorean triple can be generated using any two positive integers by the following procedures using generalized Fibonacci sequences.

is a Pythagorean triple.

Method III

The following is a matrix-based approach to generating primitive triples with generalized Fibonacci sequences.  Start with a 2 × 2 array and insert two coprime positive integers ( q,q' ) in the top row. Place the even integer (if any) in the   column.

 

Now apply the following "Fibonacci rule" to get the entries in the bottom 
row:

 

Such an array may be called a "Fibonacci Box".  Note that   q', q, p, p'   is a generalized Fibonacci sequence. Taking column, row, and diagonal products we obtain the sides of triangle [a, b, c], its area A, and its perimeter P, as well as the radii ri of its incircle and three excircles as follows:

 

The half-angle tangents at the acute angles are q/p and q'/p'.

EXAMPLE:

Using coprime integers 9 and 2.

 

The column, row, and diagonal products are: (columns: 22 and 117), (rows: 18 and 143), (diagonals: 26 and 99), so

 

The half-angle tangents at the acute angles are 2/11 and 9/13.  Note that if the chosen integers q, q' are not coprime, the same procedure leads to a non-primitive triple.

Pythagorean triples and Descartes' circle equation

This method of generating primitive Pythagorean triples also provides integer solutions to Descartes' Circle Equation,

 

where integer curvatures  ki are obtained by multiplying the reciprocal of each radius by the area A. The result is k1 = pp',  k2 = qp', k3 = q'p,  k4 = qq'.  Here, the largest circle is taken as having negative curvature with respect to the other three. The largest circle (curvature k4) may also be replaced by a smaller circle with positive curvature ( k0 = 4pp' − qq' ). 

EXAMPLE: 

Using the area and four radii obtained above for primitive triple [44, 117, 125] we obtain the following integer solutions to Descartes' Equation:  k1 = 143, k2 = 99, k3 = 26, k4 = (−18), and k0 = 554.

A Ternary Tree:  Generating All Primitive Pythagorean Triples

Each primitive Pythagorean triple corresponds uniquely to a Fibonacci Box.  Conversely, each Fibonacci Box corresponds to a unique and primitive Pythagorean triple. In this section we shall use the Fibonacci Box in place of the primitive triple it represents.  An infinite ternary tree containing all primitive Pythagorean triples/Fibonacci Boxes can be constructed by the following procedure.

Consider a Fibonacci Box containing two, odd, coprime integers x and y in the right-hand column.

 

It may be seen that these integers can also be placed as follows:
 
 

resulting in three more valid Fibonacci boxes containing x and y. We may think of the first Box as the "parent" of the next three.  For example, if x = 1 and y = 3 we have:

 

 

Moreover, each "child" is itself the parent of three more children which can be obtained by the same procedure.   Continuing this process at each node leads to an infinite ternary tree containing all possible Fibonacci Boxes, or equivalently, to a ternary tree containing all possible primitive triples.  (The tree shown here is distinct from the classic tree described by Berggren in 1934, and has many different number-theoretic properties.)  Compare: "Classic Tree".  See also Tree of primitive Pythagorean triples.

Generating triples using quadratic equations

There are several methods for defining quadratic equations for calculating each leg of a Pythagorean triple.   A simple method is to modify the standard Euclid equation by adding a variable x to each m and n pair.    The m, n pair is treated as a constant while the value of x is varied to produce a "family" of triples based on the selected triple.  An arbitrary coefficient can be placed in front of the "x" value on either m or n, which causes the resulting equation to systematically "skip" through the triples.   For example, consider the  triple  [20, 21, 29] which can be calculated from the Euclid equations with a value of m = 5 and n = 2.   Also, arbitrarily put the coefficient of 4 in front of the "x" in the "m" term.

Let  and let 

Hence, substituting the values of m and n:

 

Note that the original triple comprises the constant term in each of the respective quadratic equations.  Below is a sample output from these equations.  Note that the effect of these equations is to cause the "m" value in the Euclid equations to increment in steps of 4, while the "n" value increments by 1.

Generating all primitive Pythagorean triples using half-angle tangents
A primitive Pythagorean triple can be reconstructed from a half-angle tangent.

We can calculate  from the formula for the tangent of the difference of angles.

Pythagorean triples by use of matrices and linear transformations

Let  be a primitive triple with  odd. Each child is itself the parent of 3 more children, and so on. If one begins with primitive triple [3, 4, 5], all primitive triples will eventually be produced by application of these matrices. An equivalent result may be obtained using Berggrens's three linear transformations shown below.

 

Berggren's three linear transformations are:

 

Alternatively, one may also use 3 different matrices found by Price. These matrices A', B', C''' and their corresponding linear transformations are shown below.

 

Price's three linear transformations are

 

The 3 children produced by each of the two sets of matrices are not the same, but each set separately produces all primitive triples. 
 
For example, using [5, 12, 13] as the parent, we get two sets of three children:

 

Area proportional to sums of squares

Height-excess enumeration theorem

Wade and Wade first introduced the categorization of Pythagorean triples by their height, defined as c - b, linking 3,4,5 to 5,12,13 and 7,24,25 and so on.

McCullough and Wade extended this approach, which produces all Pythagorean triples when  Write a positive integer h as pq2 with p square-free and q positive. Set d = 2pq if p is odd, or d= pq if p is even. For all pairs (h, k) of positive integers, the triples are given by

The primitive triples occur when gcd(k, h) = 1 and either h=q2 with q odd or h=2q''2.

References

Number theory